= Flegomene =

Italian physicist

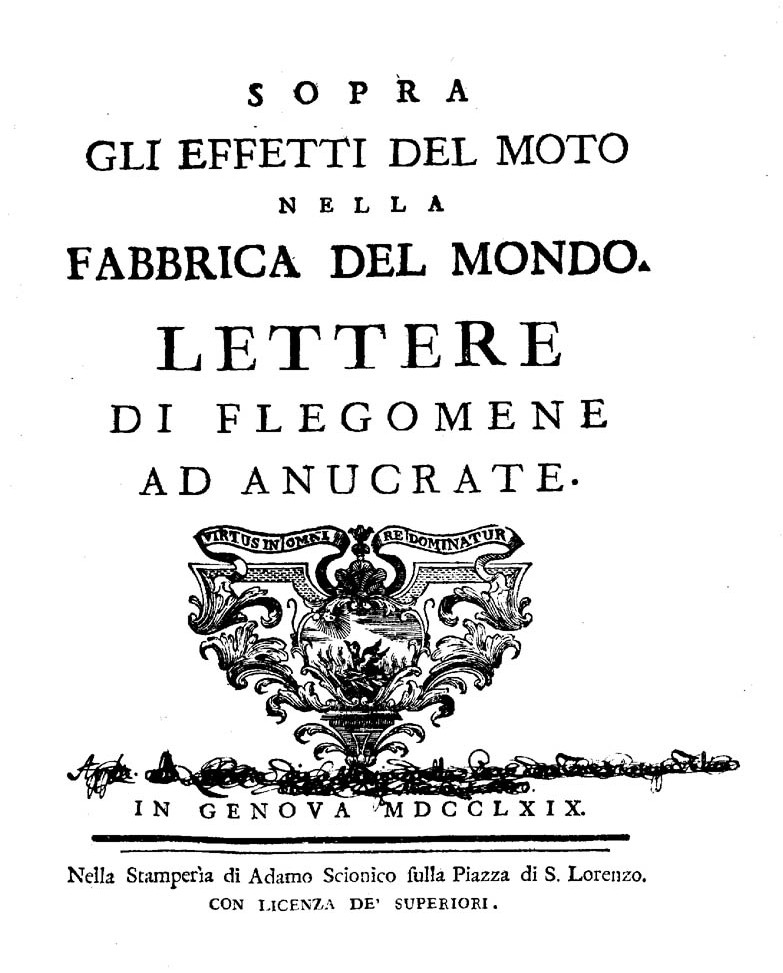
Sopra gli effetti del moto nella fabbrica del mondo, 1769

Flegomene was the pen name of an 18th-century Italian physicist.

His real name is unknown. He wrote Sopra gli effetti del moto nella fabbrica del mondo ("On the effects of motion in the factory of the world") in the form of an epistolary, published in 1769 in Genoa.

== Works ==
- Sopra gli effetti del moto nella fabbrica del mondo. Lettere di Flegomene ad Anucrate (in Italian). Genova: Stamperia di Adamo Scionico. 1769.

== Bibliography ==
- Carlo Bitossi (2004). Erudizione e storiografia settentesche in Liguria. Atti del convegno, Genova, 14–15 novembre 2003 (in Italian). Genova: Accademia ligure di scienze e lettere. pp. 599, 622. ISBN 978-88-86746-17-5.
- Marco Santoro; Maria Gioia Tavoni (2005). I dintorni del testo: approcci alle periferie del libro. Atti del convegno internazionale, Roma, 15-17 novembre 2004, Bologna, 18-19 novembre 2004 (in Italian). Vol. 2. Edizioni dell'Ateneo. ISBN 978-88-8476-101-9.
